Fizik (also Romanized as Fīzīk; also known as Fezīk and Fīzak) is a village in Fakhrud Rural District, Qohestan District, Darmian County, South Khorasan Province, Iran. At the 2006 census, its population was 172, in 46 families.

References 

Populated places in Darmian County